The 1989 U.S. Pro Tennis Championships was a men's tennis tournament played on outdoor green clay courts at the Longwood Cricket Club in Chestnut Hill, Massachusetts in the United States. The event was part of the Super Series of the 1989 Nabisco Grand Prix circuit. It was the 62nd edition of the tournament and was held from July 10 through July 16, 1989. Sixth-seeded Andrés Gómez won the singles title, his second at the event after 1986.

Finals

Singles
 Andrés Gómez defeated  Mats Wilander 6–1, 6–4
 It was Gómez' 1st singles title of the year and the 16th of his career.

Doubles
 Andrés Gómez /  Alberto Mancini defeated  Todd Nelson /  Phillip Williamson 3–6, 6–3, 6–4

References

External links
 ITF tournament details
 Longwood Cricket Club – list of U.S. Pro Champions

U.S. Pro Tennis Championships
U.S. Pro Championships
U.S. Pro Championships
U.S. Pro Championships
U.S. Pro Championships
Chestnut Hill, Massachusetts
Clay court tennis tournaments
History of Middlesex County, Massachusetts
Sports in Middlesex County, Massachusetts
Tennis tournaments in Massachusetts
Tourist attractions in Middlesex County, Massachusetts